Hi-5 (also known as Hi-5 USA) is an American children's television series produced by Kids Like Us for Discovery Kids. It also aired on TLC, on the Ready Set Learn programming blocks of both networks. It is based on the original Australian series of the same name, created by Helena Harris and Posie Graeme-Evans, and was filmed and produced in Australia. The program is known for its educational content and pop music appeal, with the cast of the show known collectively as Hi-5. The series premiered on February 24, 2003. The program was nominated for three Emmy Awards.

Format
Hi-5 is a variety-style series for pre-schoolers that features music as an integral part of its premise. The program features five presenters who are collectively known as Hi-5, who perform songs as a group as well as present individual segments.

The Puzzles and Patterns segment focuses on logical thinking and mathematics, with a puppet named Jup Jup. Jup Jup is used to help complete puzzles or solve problems. The presenter of the segment Body Move encourages children to participate in movement and dance to develop physical coordination and motor development. Linguistics and aural skills are at the center of the Word Play segment. Word Play features a puppet named Chatterbox, who assists in the exploration of language through stories and rhymes. Shapes in Space focuses on visual and spatial awareness using shapes, color and everyday materials such as boxes and play dough. Musicality is explored through Making Music, with an emphasis on pitch, rhythm, beat, melody, and using a variety of real and pretend instruments. The final segment, in which the cast comes together, is entitled Sharing Stories. In this segment, the cast tells a story that explores interpersonal relationships and emotions.

The episodes are bookended with a Song of the Week; a pop-style feature song that corresponds with the weekly theme and sets an educational topic for the week's episodes.

Production
Due to the popularity and international appeal of the original Hi-5 series in Australia, it was announced in 2002 that a local American series would be introduced. The U.S. version was filmed in the Australian show's studios from September 2002 to February 2003 and made its debut in February, premiering on TLC and Discovery Kids. The cast consisted of Kimee Balmilero, Karla Cheatham Mosley, Curtis Cregan, Jennifer Korbee (née Peterson-Hind) and Shaun Taylor-Corbett. The series was nominated for a Daytime Emmy in 2005, 2006 and 2007.

The final group of 10 episodes from the second season premiered on September 25, 2006.

In August 2006, Cheatham Mosley and Taylor-Corbett left the cast to pursue other ventures. New touring members Sydney James and Yasmeen Sulieman joined Balmilero, Cregan, and Korbee, but were not featured in the television series. The group last performed together in Puerto Rico in 2008.

Music
The program uses music as an integral part of its concept, and like the original Australian group, the cast of the American series became a recognized musical group for children outside of the show, known collectively as Hi-5. The debut album of the group, Jump and Jive with Hi-5, corresponded with the first season of the show and was released in September 2004 by Koch Entertainment. A special holiday album, It's a Hi-5 Christmas, was released in October 2005. The cast also toured malls and theaters in the U.S., performing songs from the television series. After Cheatham Mosley and Taylor-Corbett departed, the group continued to tour around the Americas with Sulieman and James throughout 2007 before the group's final performance in Puerto Rico in 2008. Chris Harriott was the primary composer of the show, with the songs written for the Australian group also being used for the American cast.

Home Media
On August 1, 2003, it was announced that Southern Star had signed a home media deal with MGM Home Entertainment to release the series on VHS and DVD in the country. MGM would go on to release three volumes on the formats in 2004 under their family-friendly "MGM Kids" banner.

Cast

Presenters
 Kimee Balmilero - Puzzles and Patterns
 Karla Cheatham Mosley - Body Move
 Curtis Cregan - Making Music
 Jennifer Korbee (née Peterson-Hind) - Word Play
 Shaun Taylor-Corbett - Shapes in Space

Sydney James and Yasmeen Sulieman joined the group in August 2006, replacing Taylor-Corbett and Cheatham Mosley, respectively, but were not featured in the television series.

Series overview

Episodes

Season 1 (2003–04)

Season 2 (2005–06)

Awards and nominations
The series was nominated for three Daytime Emmy Award for Outstanding Pre-School Children's Series awards in 2005, 2006 and 2007, but did not win any.

References

 Barrera, Sandra. (August 18, 2007) Los Angeles Daily News Hi-5 cast members talk about what it's like to be pop icons and role models. Section: LA.COM; Page L12

External links
 

Child musical groups
American children's musical groups
American television shows featuring puppetry
2003 American television series debuts
2006 American television series endings
2000s American children's television series
2000s American music television series
American children's musical television series
TLC (TV network) original programming
Discovery Kids original programming
American preschool education television series
2000s preschool education television series
American television series based on Australian television series
American television series with live action and animation
English-language television shows